The Oceanographic Institute of Venezuela (in Spanish: Instituto Oceanográfico de Venezuela, IOV) is an academic and research institution within the Universidad de Oriente which specializes in applied research and teaching in the fields of  marine biology, oceanography and fisheries science.

The institute is located on the Cerro Colorado campus of Universidad de Oriente in Cumana, Sucre. Its facilities include two buildings which house administrative offices, laboratories, classrooms, and the Rafael Antonio Curra library - a specialized books and magazines depository on marine biology and oceanography bibliography.

History 

After the Venezuelan Association for the Advancement of Science (in Spanish: Asociación Venezolana para el Avance de la Ciencia, AsoVAC) was founded in 1950 under the direction of the distinguished physician and academic Francisco De Venanzi, the concern for creating an oceanographic research center in Venezuela arose.

The Oceanographic Institute of Venezuela was created as a branch of the Universidad de Oriente by means of the Executive Order 459 of President Edgar Sanabria signed on November 21, 1958. The institute began its work in 1959 at the Marine Biology Laboratory of the Ministry of Agriculture in Caigüire, Sucre, and moved to its definitive headquarters at the Universidad de Oriente main campus in the city of Cumana, in 1963.

It is one of the oldest and most important centers for oceanographic and marine science research and teaching in the Caribbean and Latin America regions.

The first director de the institute was Dr. Pedro Roa Morales (1926-1995), a Sorbonne-graduate in marine geology and sedimentology.

Directors of the Oceanographic Institute of Venezuela

External links 

 Location of the Oceanographic Institute of Venezuela

See also 

 Universidad de Oriente
 IVIC

References 

1958 establishments in Venezuela
Oceanographic organizations
Research institutes in Venezuela
Universities in Venezuela